The Serious Fraud Investigation Office (SFIO) is a statutory corporate fraud investigating agency in India. Initially, it was set up by a resolution adopted by the Government of India on 2 July 2003 and carried out investigations within the existing legal framework under section 235 to 247 of the erstwhile Companies Act, 1956. Later, Section 211 of the Companies Act, 2013, accorded the statutory status to the Serious Fraud Investigation Office (SFIO). It is under the jurisdiction of the Ministry of Corporate Affairs, Government of India & primarily supervised by officers from Indian Administrative Service, Indian Police Service, Indian Corporate Law Service, Indian Revenue Service and other Central Services. The organisation has experts from various financial sector domains. The SFIO is mandated to conduct Multi-disciplinary investigations of major corporate frauds.

It is a multi-disciplinary organization having experts from financial sector, capital market, accountancy, forensic audit, taxation, law, information technology, company law, customs and investigation. These experts have been taken from various organizations like banks, Securities and Exchange Board of India, Comptroller and Auditor General and concerned organizations and departments of the Government. Based on the recommendation of Naresh Chandra Committee on corporate governance (which was set up by the Government on 21 August 2002) and in the backdrop of stock market scams as also the failure of non-banking companies resulting in huge financial loss to the public, Vajpayee Government decided to set up SFIO on 9 January 2003.

Organisation structure 
Agency headquarters is in the Indian capital, New Delhi, with field offices located in major cities throughout India. The SFIO draws most of its officers from the ICLS, IAS, IPS, IRS and banks & other central services. The current SFIO director is Keshav Chandra (IAS). Many Additional, Joint and deputy director level officers are from ministry 's parent cadre, Indian Corporate Law Service.

The agency has four regional offices in Hyderabad, Mumbai, Kolkata and Chennai.

References 

Fraud
Indian intelligence agencies
Ministry of Corporate Affairs
Vajpayee administration